Brown energy or brown power are terms that have been coined to describe energy produced from polluting sources as a contrast to green energy from renewable, non-polluting sources. The term "grey energy" or "gray energy" has been used instead, including by the United Nations.

See also
 Brownout (electricity)

References

Energy